was a professional wrestling event promoted by DDT Pro-Wrestling (DDT). It took place on March 20, 2020, in Tokyo, Japan, at the Korakuen Hall with a record low attendance of 916 people due in part to the ongoing COVID-19 pandemic at the time. It was the twenty-fourth event under the Judgement name. The event aired domestically on Fighting TV Samurai and globally on DDT's video-on-demand service DDT Universe.

Storylines
Judgement 2020 featured nine professional wrestling matches that involved different wrestlers from pre-existing scripted feuds and storylines. Wrestlers portrayed villains, heroes, or less distinguishable characters in the scripted events that built tension and culminated in a wrestling match or series of matches.

Event
The event saw the Ironman Heavymetalweight Championship change hands during and in between matches. Going into the event, Toru Owashi was the reigning 1,473rd champion but he was pinned by Masahiro Takanashi as he was making his entrance for the battle royal. During the match, Hiroshi Yamato and Owashi simultaneously pinned Takanashi to become co-champions. A few seconds later, Yamato and Owashi were simultaneously pinned by Mizuki Watase, Antonio Honda, Danshoku Dino and Yukio Naya who became the new co-champions. Then, Kazuki Hirata successively pinned Watase, Honda, Naya and finally Dino to win the match and "unify" the title. After the match, Owashi pinned Hirata as he was celebrating his victory to regain the championship as the 1,478th champion.

Just after his match against Eruption, Tetsuya Endo was challenged by Royce Chambers who cashed-in his Right To Challenge Anytime, Anywhere in the hope of winning Endo's Right To Challenge at Saitama Super Arena Sword. Endo won the bout and retained the sword.

The event also saw two singles championship matches as Daisuke Sasaki defeated Chris Brookes to win the newly created DDT Universal Championship, and Masato Tanaka retained the KO-D Openweight Championship against Konosuke Takeshita.

Results

References

External links
The official DDT Pro-Wrestling website

2020
2020 in professional wrestling
Professional wrestling in Tokyo
Professional wrestling anniversary shows